Richard Moore PC (1783 – 31 December 1857) was an Irish lawyer and judge.

Background

He was born at Barne, near Clonmel, County Tipperary, second son of Stephen Moore of Salisbury House, and his wife and cousin Salisbury Moore. The Moores of Clonmel were a junior branch of the landowning family whose senior branch acquired the title Earl Mount Cashell. Richard himself, though he lived mainly in  Dublin, owned some property in Tipperary. Stephen Moore (1836-1897), MP for Tipperary from 1875 to 1880, was his great-nephew.

Family

Richard married firstly Frances Bligh, daughter of the Reverend Thomas Bligh, by whom he had a son, Richard Moore junior of Killashee House, Naas, County Kildare;  and secondly in 1824 Wilhelmina Westby (died 1860), youngest daughter of William Westby of Thornhill, County Dublin and his first wife Mary Fletcher of Tottenham, by who he had a son, William Westby Moore of Hampshire, and a daughter Frances, who died unmarried in her late twenties.

Early career

He was educated at the University of Dublin, where he took his Bachelor of Arts degree in 1803, entered the Middle Temple in 1804, was called to the Irish Bar in 1806 and became King's Counsel in 1827. He became Third Serjeant, a Bencher of the King's Inn, and Solicitor General for Ireland in 1840. Though he supported the Liberals, Elrington Ball states that he was not much interested in politics.

Later career

Moore was Attorney-General for Ireland during part of Lord John Russell's Whig Government 1846-1852, holding that office from 16 July 1846 to 21 December 1847. He was then appointed as a judge of the Court of Queen's Bench (Ireland) and remained a judge until his death.  

He was one of the Special Commission judges appointed for the trial in which William Smith O'Brien was convicted of high treason for his part in the Young Irelander Rebellion of 1848 (The Queen v O'Brien (1849) 3 Cox CC 360). O'Brien's death sentence was commuted to one of transportation and he received an unconditional pardon in 1856, after which he returned to Ireland.

Reputation
Ball states that Moore was universally respected for his legal ability, notwithstanding a certain modesty and diffidence about his own talents. An anonymous pamphlet from 1850, which was critical of many members of the Irish Bench, had high praise for Moore's intellect.

St. Enda's School

From 1840 until his death Moore lived mainly in Rathfarnham, Dublin. His house, "The Hermitage", later became famous as St. Enda's School, the secondary school for boys founded by Padraic Pearse. Moore's heirs sold the house in 1859. The house and grounds have been owned by the State since 1968 and the house is now the Pearse Museum

References

  (available at Project Gutenberg )

  (available at http://www.southdublinlibraries.ie)

19th-century Irish lawyers
Irish barristers
Solicitors-General for Ireland
1783 births
1857 deaths
Members of the Privy Council of Ireland
Attorneys-General for Ireland
Alumni of Trinity College Dublin
Members of the Middle Temple
People from County Tipperary
Justices of the Irish King's Bench
Serjeants-at-law (Ireland)